Kankar is a 2013 Pakistani drama television serial aired on Hum TV from 31 May 2013 to 6 December 2013. It was directed by Aabis Raza and written by Umera Ahmad. The serial starred Fahad Mustafa and Sanam Baloch.

Plot
It is a story of two best friends who are paternal cousins, Arzoo and Kiran. Arzoo is a rich girl who is in love with her rich maternal cousin Sikandar. On the other hand, Kiran's cousin Adnan likes her but cannot ask for her hand in marriage due to his poor financial conditions and his sister's upcoming marriage. Sikandar falls in love with Kiran when he meets her on the occasion of Arzoo's brother's marriage and insists that his mother should go and talk to Kiran's parents for him. This leads to the dispute between the families. Arzoo breaks her friendship with Kiran and envies her. Kiran and Sikandar are married but they soon start indulging into huge fights which end in Kiran being physically abused by Sikandar. Furthermore, she is even scolded by her mother-in-law for Kiran's outspoken nature. However, the couple's fights lead to Kiran suffering a miscarriage as Sikandar, in a fit of rage, throws her onto the ground. He tries to apologize but Kiran asks Sikandar for a divorce. The families tries their best to change their mind, but Kiran is adamant, and Sikandar unwillingly divorces her. After his divorce, Sikandar's mother quickly get him married to Arzoo. 
Arzoo is pleased with the marriage but is bothered by Sikandar's feelings for his ex-wife. People start blaming Kiran for her broken marriage and praise Arzoo for her luck. Adnan's sister finally gets married after her long-term engagement but still lives with her mother and brother as her husband is in abroad. Adnan tries to convince his mother into asking for Kiran's hand in marriage for him, but she disapproves as she doesn't want a divorcee to marry her only son. Despite the negativity associated with Kiran being a divorcee, Adnan is able to persuade both the families and they are married in a simple ceremony. Upon finding out about Kiran's second marriage to her cousin, Sikandar's jealousy makes him erupt in anger which leads to intense arguments with Arzoo. Arzoo leaves the house and breaks down in front of her mother. Sikandar's mother scolds her son for the embarrassment that she had to face in front of Arzoo's parents because of his behavior. Sikandar asks for Arzoo to pardon him and gets her back. Kiran finds it difficult to adjust in Adnan's house because his sister's rude behaviour and tantrums. Soon, even Adnan and Kiran start having arguments but end up sorting everything out. Arzoo is soon blessed with a baby boy and sweetmeats are distributed in the family. Kiran too receives a box from Arzoo's mother which angers Adnan. Sikandar overhears Arzoo talking to her mother about Kiran's fights with Adnan and this fills him with glee. When his wife asks to be told the reason for his joy, Sikandar cannot help but become the ultimate epitome of narcissism. This causes the couple to fight. Sikandar ends up abusing Arzoo and she leaves again with her baby. Sikandar's behavior is exposed to the family, and they realise Kiran was right for leaving him. Adnan's brother-in-law calls his wife and tells her that her paperwork has been completed and that she can finally move with him. She is filled with joy and tries to make up for her previous rotten treatment with Kiran. Arzoo visits Kiran and tells her she made the right decision of leaving Sikandar. Kiran advises her to think wisely before taking any decision as she also has a child to care for. One day, Kiran, with her sister-in-law, is in the market & happens to stumble into Sikandar. He confesses that he truly loves her and would even divorce Arzoo just to get her back which warrants a slap from her, and she warns him to never disrespect a woman or raise his hand on one ever again. Sikandar realises his mistakes and begs for Arzoo's forgiveness. Adnan's sister apologizes to her brother and his wife for all the trouble that she caused between them.
At the end, Kiran and Adnan are thrilled as they are expecting a child together.

Main characters 
 Fahad Mustafa as Sikander
 Sanam Baloch as Kiran
 Ismat Zaidi as Aisha (Kiran's mother)
 Behroze Sabzwari as Jamal (Kiran's father)
 Diya Mughal as Iram (Kiran's sister)
 Shakeel as Kamal (Arzoo's Father/Kiran's paternal uncle/Taya and Sikander's maternal uncle/Khalu)
 Sheheryar Zaidi as Waqar (Sikander's father)
 Sabahat Ali Bukhari as Fayka (Arzoo's mother)
 Humaira Ali as Aapa (Jamal and Kamal's Sister/Adnan and Rukhsar's mother)
 Uroosa Siddiqui as Rukhsar (Adnan's sister)
 Maha Warsi as Arzoo (Kiran's friend and cousin)
 Hassan Niazi as Adnan (Aapa's son)
 Laila Zuberi as Shaista (Sikander's mother)

Broadcast and release 
It aired on Zindagi (India), started from 13 April 2016. It was also released on the iflix app as a part of channel's contract with the app but later on, on terminating the contract in 2019, all the episodes were pulled off and thus had no digital availability to stream. In 2019, it was released on another app Starzplay. In April 2020, all the episodes of the show were released on Hum TV's official app. The show is currently airing on Hum Sitaray.

Reception 
Kankar received positive reviews from critics with praise for Baloch's performance as Kiran, Mustafa's performance as Sikandar and major appraisal towards the script. Express Tribune praised the empowered portrayal of the victimised women of domestic abuse, and praised the storyline stating, "The main factor that makes Kankar different from serials portraying a similar story line is that in spite of social and family pressure, Kiran stands up for herself and asks Sikandar for a divorce". DAWN Images praised its storyline and in another article listed it in "Exemplary Urdu dramas".

Accolades

References

External links 
 
 All Episodes Kankar

2013 Pakistani television series debuts
Hum TV original programming
Pakistani drama television series